This is a listing of material released by Ray LaMontagne, a singer-songwriter from New Hampshire, United States. LaMontagne was working at a shoe factory in Lewiston, Maine when he heard the song "Treetop Flyer" from Stephen Stills' Stills Alone album. The song inspired him to quit his job and become a musician. A ten song demo from LaMontagne circulated amongst record executives, eventually prompting Chrysalis Music Publishing to help him record an album. LaMontagne's debut album, Trouble, was distributed by RCA Records and Echo Records. The album was a success; despite a low peak on the Billboard Hot 100. It has sold over 529,000 copies in the US to date. In the UK, however, the album reached the top 5 and the title track became a top 40 hit. LaMontagne has released five other studio albums, 16 singles and 3 officially released extended plays after his debut. His album Monovision is scheduled for release in summer 2020.

Discography

Studio albums

Compilations
Acre of Land (2001)

Extended plays

Singles

Other contributions
Prime Soundtrack (2005, Varèse Sarabande) - "Shelter"
Acoustic 05 (2005, Echo) - "Forever My Friend"
A Lot Like Love Soundtrack (2005, Columbia Records) - "Trouble"
The Last Kiss Soundtrack (2006, Lakeshore Records) - "Hold You In My Arms"
The Devil Wears Prada Soundtrack (2006, Warner Bros./Wea) - "How Come"
The Saturday Sessions: The Dermot O'Leary Show (2007, EMI) - "Trouble"
The Fault in Our Stars Soundtrack (2014, Atlantic/Fox Music) - "Without Words"

Videography
"Supernova" (2014)

References

Notes

Sources

External links
Ray LaMontagne's official U.S. site
Ray LaMontagne's official U.K. site

Discographies of American artists
Folk music discographies
Rhythm and blues discographies